Highway 106, the Hanson Lake Road, is a fully paved provincial highway in the Canadian province of Saskatchewan. It runs from Highway 55 near Smeaton to Highway 167 in Creighton.

Highway 106 also connects with Highway 691, Highway 692, Highway 928, Highway 120, Highway 912, Highway 913, Highway 932, Highway 933, Highway 165, Highway 911, Highway 135.

Many provincial recreation sites are directly accessible from Highway 106, including Narrow Hills Provincial Park, Big Sandy Lake Recreation Site, and Hanson Lake Recreation Site. Highway 106 does not pass through any communities, with the exception of Smeaton and Creighton.

Major intersections 
From south to north:

References

External links 
 Narrow Hills Provincial Park
 Hanson Lake Provincial Recreation Site

106